Jelita is a Polish coat of arms. It was used by several szlachta families.

History
One of the oldest Polish coats of arms. First depicted on the seal of Tomisław z Mokrska from 1316.

Additionally, the Polish medieval chronicler, diplomat and soldier Jan Długosz referred to those bearing the Jelita coat of arms as "a clan born in Poland of men who are modestly devoted to dogs and hunting."

Legend
Legend has it that this coat of arms was granted by King Władysław I Łokietek to a peasant soldier (and his family) after the Battle of Płowce (1331) in which the Polish armies defeated the 40,000-strong force of the Teutonic Knights with minimal casualties.  The man fought with great courage and only fell in battle when pierced by three spears in the abdominal area which caused his bowels to fall out.  Shortly before his death, the King ennobled the fatally wounded man. Hence, the three crossed spears in the coat of arms, as well as the name Jelita, Bowels or Guts.

Blazon

There are three lances of gold (or yellow), displayed in the design of a star on a red field, so that two on the sides are shown with their ends and points upward and the center lance with its point straight downward. on the helmet is a demi goat leaping with its forepaws upward, facing to the right, with horns on its head. The goat on top is the symbol of persistence, practical wisdom and an emblem of a man who wins through diplomacy rather than war. It may also refer to the goat crest of Lublin. The Act of the Union of Lublin, signed in 1569, created the so-called Commonwealth of two Nations, under one monarch, with one parliament and unified monetary systems.

The heraldic  motto of this coat of arms is "To mniey boli" (It hurts less).

Notable bearers
Notable bearers of this coat of arms include:

 House of Zamoyski
 Adam Zamoyski
 Jan Zamoyski
 Joanna Barbara Zamoyska
 Gryzelda Konstancja Zamoyska
 Jan "Sobiepan" Zamoyski
 Tomasz Zamoyski
 Florian Pacanowski
 Józef Śliwicki
 Ignacy Jan Paderewski
 Franciszek Dąbrowski
 Stefan Żeromski
 Witold Lutosławski
 Ryszard Kaczorowski
 Jacek Saryusz-Wolski
 Count Petr Mikhaïlovitch Korwin-Litwicki  (1796-1856}, titular councillor of the Russian Empire

Gallery

See also
 Polish heraldry
 Heraldic family
 List of Polish nobility coats of arms

Bibliography
 Tadeusz Gajl: Herbarz polski od średniowiecza do XX wieku : ponad 4500 herbów szlacheckich 37 tysięcy nazwisk 55 tysięcy rodów. L&L, 2007. .
 Alfred Znamierowski: Herbarz rodowy. Warszawa: Świat Książki, 2004, s. 112. .

References

External links
 http://www.tchorznicki.com/herb_ojelitczykach.html 

Polish coats of arms